Pesik is a village in the Qabala Rayon of Azerbaijan.

It is suspected that this village has undergone a name change or no longer exists, as no Azerbaijani website mentions it under this name.

External links
 

Populated places in Qabala District